Ambrosia Tønnesen (28 January 1859 – 21 January 1948) was a Norwegian sculptor. She is regarded as the first professional female sculptor in Norway, and is best known for her many portraits, including statues, busts, and reliefs.

Personal life and education
Tønnesen was born in Ålesund, a daughter of steamshipmaster Abraham Tønnesen (1818–1868) and Thomine Jonasen. She worked as a schoolteacher in Bergen for some years, while also studying drawing, modeling, and painting. In 1885 she travelled to Copenhagen where she studied with painter Bertha Wegmann and sculptor Stephan Sinding. She then studied with sculptor Albert Wolff in Berlin, and further with René de Saint-Marceaux in Paris. Ambrosia met her partner, Mary Banks, in 1888 and the two women lived together for 30 years in Paris, and Bergen, Norway.

Career

Among Tønnesen's early sculptures are Våren (1885), Sneklokken (1887; a young girl), Den onde Hjørdis (1890), and Den korsfestede Kristus ("The Crucified Christ"; marble sculpture in Årstad Church, 1890). She made a large number of portraits (statues, busts, and reliefs), and is regarded as the first female Norwegian sculptor who made her living from her art.

Tønnesen was decorated with the French order Officier d'Académie.

Death
She died in Fana (now Bergen) on 21 January 1948, aged 88.

Literature
 
 Jorunn Veiteberg (2009) Ambrosia Tønnesen. Stenhugger i det Fine

References 

1859 births
1948 deaths
19th-century Norwegian sculptors
19th-century Norwegian women artists
20th-century Norwegian sculptors
20th-century Norwegian women artists
Lesbian artists
Norwegian LGBT artists
Norwegian women sculptors
People from Ålesund
Officiers of the Ordre des Palmes Académiques